San Juan de Opoa is a municipality in the Honduran department of Copán.

It was one of the first villages founded by the Spaniards in 1526.

Municipalities of the Copán Department